Fauji Foods Limited, formerly known as Noon Pakistan Limited, is a Pakistani food company which is a subsidiary of Pakistani conglomerate company Fauji Foundation, owned by Pakistan Army. 

The company is known for its dairy products and brands such as Nurpur, and Dostea. The company is based in Lahore, Pakistan. It is listed on the Pakistan Stock Exchange.

History

Noon family 
The company was established in 1966 as part of Noon Group by Pakistani political family Noon family. The company shares were formerly held by Pakistani politician Malik Adnan Hayat Noon and Salman Hayat Noon with 48.9 percent and 25.5 percent respectively.

Fauji Foundation 
In 2015, Fauji Foundation acquired Noon Pakistan. Before acquisition, company was in loss for two consecutive years.

In 2018, Chinese company, Yili Group, expressed its intent to buy 51 percent stake in Fauji Foods. Later, in 2019, it has withdrawn its interest.

FFBL Investment 
Fauji Fertilizer Bin Qasim will give a loan of Rs. 3.5 billion to Fauji Foods.

References

Fauji Foundation
Food and drink companies of Pakistan
2015 mergers and acquisitions
Companies listed on the Pakistan Stock Exchange
Food and drink companies established in 1966
Companies based in Lahore
Pakistani companies established in 1966